The Arts Council of Pakistan, Karachi (Urdu: آرٹس کونسل آف پاکستان کراچی), also known as ACPKHI, is a non-profit organization (NPO) in Karachi, Pakistan, focussed on the performing and fine arts through various events, theatre, dance, and music academies, literary conferences, creative endeavours, and competitive talent showcases.

See also
 National Academy of Performing Arts (Pakistan), also located nearby in Karachi

References

External links
 

1948 establishments in Pakistan
Arts councils
Arts organisations based in Pakistan
Karachi